Gradius Advance is a horizontally scrolling shooter handheld video game developed by Mobile21 and published by Konami in 2001. It is the only Gradius title available for the Game Boy Advance. The game's plot is set between Gradius III and Gradius Gaiden. Bacterion was developing a powerful weapon to use against the planet Gradius, but it was destroyed. A few years later it crashed on a planet and the planet gradually changed into a mechanical fortress. The planet Gradius then sent the Vic Viper to stop it.

Gameplay
The game play is almost identical to other titles in the series. The player takes control of the Vic Viper spacecraft tasked with destroying hordes of enemies. Various traditional elements of Gradius are present — the moai, an undefended final boss, and the upgrade power meter. The weapons system remained mostly unchanged as the configurations available are identical to Gradius III, with the exception that the edit mode is missing. There are four different types of weapons configurations: Balanced, (traditional Gradius) wide area (Salamander) power, and air-to-ground. Each configuration is indicated by the color of Vic Viper. Unlike Gradius III, there are only two shield options — shield and force field. In addition, the S. option ("snake option") is not present in this version; the player can however choose to have the computer assign weapon power-ups automatically or purchase upgrades manually.

The game's configuration allows the player to choose between three difficulty modes, with each mode consisting of three loops — progressively more difficult play-throughs that are unlocked as previous loops are cleared. The Japanese version further included a challenge game play mode that had to be unlocked by achieving a high score during a single play-through of the game's normal difficulty mode. Additional challenges could then by unlocked by completing other challenges. The challenge mode was absent from the U.S. and European releases due to the game being released in Japan several months later.

Reception

The game received "generally favorable reviews" according to the review aggregation website Metacritic. Nintendo World Report praised the game's awesomeness and said that "it could even be considered the GBA's Ikaruga." IGN praised the game's ability to save high scores directly to cartridge. In Japan, Famitsu gave it a score of 32 out of 40.

References

External links
Official website

2001 video games
Game Boy Advance games
Game Boy Advance-only games
Gradius video games
Video games developed in Japan